The Espérance was a Rhône-class scow of the French Navy, launched in 1781 and later reclassified as a frigate. She earned fame as one of the ships of Bruni d'Entrecasteaux's expedition. The Australian town of Esperance and Esperance Bay in Western Australia were named after her. She was sold for breaking up in 1794.

Career 
Espérance was built as Durance and served in de Grasse's squadron as a troopship. On 18 December 1782, she departed Toulon with the frigates Précieuse and Prosélyte, and the corvette , in a convoy bound for the Caribbean, that also included the fluyts Gracieuse and Rhône.

A decade later, on 29 September 1791, Espérance under Captain Huon de Kermadec, and  sailed from Brest to New Caledonia. They were on a mission under the command of Admiral d'Entrecasteaux in search of the explorer Lapérouse. The mission was unsuccessful: it was not until 1826 that the mystery of Laperouse's disappearance was solved.

Fate
On 28 October 1793, Espérance was captured by the Dutch at Surabaya, only to be returned to France in February 1794. She was sold to Holland in September and sold for scrap two months later.

See also
 European and American voyages of scientific exploration

Sources and references 

Exploration ships
1781 ships
Frigates of the French Navy